Pametnik (Bulgarian and Serbian: Паметник, Bulgarian word for monument) is memorial ossuary  and monument to Serbian and Bulgarian soldiers who fought in Battle of Caribrod during Serbo-Bulgarian War. The monument is located on Neškovo brdo in Dimitrovgrad, Serbia. It is considered as anti-war symbol of the war and battle where fought soldiers of two countries and later buried together in one ossuary.

About the monument 
The monument was raised at the request of the Bulgarian colonel Pačev who was military commander in Caribrod and commander of 25th Dragoman Regiment on elevation point 678 after fratricidal battle on November 24, 1885 (or November 12 by old style calendar). Exact number of buried soldiers isn't known but it is assumed that there is between 100 and 300 soldiers. Its shape is made of two geometrical components - pyramid and two hexahedrons with Orthodox cross on top. It is made of cut and hewed stone and bricks.

Gallery

See also 
 Serbo-Bulgarian War
 Dimitrovgrad, Serbia

External links 
 Kultura na dar - Pametnik, short video about Pametnik in Serbian

References 

Monuments and memorials in Serbia
Serbo-Bulgarian War
Pirot District